Ngoni Mupamba (born 2 April 1990) is a Zimbabwean cricketer. He made his List A debut for Mountaineers in the 2017–18 Pro50 Championship on 11 May 2018. He made his first-class debut for Mountaineers in the 2017–18 Logan Cup on 13 May 2018, scoring 158 runs in the first innings.

References

External links
 

1990 births
Living people
Zimbabwean cricketers
Place of birth missing (living people)
Mountaineers cricketers